This is a list of head coaches for the Philadelphia Eagles. The Philadelphia Eagles are a professional American football team based in Philadelphia, Pennsylvania. The Eagles joined the National Football League (NFL) as an expansion team in 1933. Currently members of the Eastern Division of the National Football Conference (NFC), the team has won four NFL titles and made four Super Bowl appearances (1980, 2004, 2017, and 2022), with their first Super Bowl victory coming in Super Bowl LII under Doug Pederson.

Three coaches have won NFL championships with the team: Earl "Greasy" Neale in 1948 and 1949, Buck Shaw in 1960, and Pederson in Super Bowl LII. Andy Reid is the all-time leader in games coached and wins, while Sirianni has the highest winning percentage with .676 (with at least one full season coached). Bert Bell is statistically the worst coach the Eagles have had in terms of winning percentage, with .185 win/loss percentage.

Of the 24 Eagles coaches, four have been elected into the Pro Football Hall of Fame. Bert Bell was a charter member of the Hall of Fame. Bell was inducted for his work as the NFL Commissioner from 1946 to 1959. Wayne Millner, who coached the team in 1951, was enshrined as a player in 1968.  Greasy Neale was in the class of 1969 for his work as the Eagles coach in the 1940s. Mike McCormack made the 1984 class for his Offensive Tackle play.  Several former NFL players have been head coaches for the Eagles, including Jerry Williams, Ed Khayat, and Marion Campbell. Andy Reid spent 14 seasons in charge before he was fired on December 31, 2012, after a 4–12 season – Reid's worst season in charge – which left the Eagles bottom of the NFC. He was replaced by former University of Oregon head coach Chip Kelly, who led the Eagles to a 10–6 record and the playoffs. Kelly was fired on December 29, 2015, after going 6–9 through that season's first 15 games. He was replaced by offensive coordinator Pat Shurmur for Week 17. Doug Pederson served as the Eagles head coach four seasons with the Eagles as their head coach before being fired on January 11, 2021, after leading the team to a 4–11–1 record. Nick Sirianni has been head coach since January 24, 2021.

Key

Coaches

Note: Statistics are accurate through the end of the 2022 NFL season.

Footnotes

References

External links
 
 
 

 
Philadelphia Eagles head coaches
Head coaches